Suvarlı is a town (belde) and municipality in the Besni District, Adıyaman Province, Turkey. The town is populated by Kurds of the Hevêdan tribe and had a population of 1,927 in 2021.

References

Towns in Turkey
Populated places in Adıyaman Province
Besni District

Kurdish settlements in Adıyaman Province